The Santa Lucía Formation is a Maastrichtian to Paleocene (Danian) geologic formation in Bolivia. Fossil ornithopod tracks have been reported from the Cretaceous lower part of the formation. It is the type formation of the Tiupampan South American land mammal age.

Description 

The Santa Lucía Formation is a formation of the Potosí Basin in Bolivia dated to the Paleocene, 60 to 58.2 Ma. It overlies the Cretaceous El Molino Formation and is overlain by the Cayara Formation. The formation is laterally equivalent with the Maíz Gordo Formation of northern Argentina, and time-equivalent with the Salamanca Formation of Argentina, the Maria Farinha Formation of the Paraíba Basin in northern Brazil and the Guaduas Formation of the Altiplano Cundiboyacense and fossiliferous Cerrejón Formation of the Cesar-Ranchería Basin, Colombia.

Paleontological significance 
The oldest known "condylarth" fauna of the Tertiary of South America comes from basal Paleocene strata of the Santa Lucía Formation at Tiupampa. It includes five genera and seven species: Molinodus suarez, Tiuclaenus minutus, T. cotasi, T. robustus, Pucanodus gagnieri, Andinodus boliviensis, and Simoclaenus sylvaticus. Because of its unique fauna, the Santa Lucía Formation at Tiupampa has been chosen as the earliest South American land mammal age giving rise to the Tiupampan.

At the Parotani tracksite, poorly preserved ichnofossils were found in the Maastrichtian part of the formation, left possibly by a carnosaur.

Fossil content 
The fossiliferous formation has provided the following fossils:

See also 
 List of dinosaur-bearing rock formations
 List of stratigraphic units with ornithischian tracks
 Ornithopod tracks

References

Bibliography 
 
 
 
 
 
 
 
 
 
 
 

 
Geologic formations of Bolivia
Upper Cretaceous Series of South America
Paleocene Series of South America
Cretaceous Bolivia
Paleogene Bolivia
 
Shale formations
Fluvial deposits
Lacustrine deposits
Formations